Čeriaukštė is a river of northern Lithuania (Panevėžys County) and southern Latvia (Bauska Municipality). It flows for 30 kilometres and has a basin area of 152 km². It is a right tributary of the Mūša.

References

Rivers of Lithuania
Biržai District Municipality
Rivers of Latvia